Fossombronia wondraczekii is a species of liverwort belonging to the family Fossombroniaceae.

It has cosmopolitan distribution.

References

Fossombroniales